This is a list of universities in the Turks and Caicos Islands.

Universities 
 Burkes University
 Charisma University
 Global University of Management and Technology
 St. Clements University
 Turks & Caicos Islands Community College
 University College of Providenciales (UCP)
 University of the West Indies - Turks and Caicos campus

References

Turks and Caicos
Education in the Turks and Caicos Islands
Turks and Caicos Islands
Universities